Remuera is a former New Zealand parliamentary electorate, in the city of Auckland. It existed from 1938, when it replaced the  electorate, until 1996. It was consistently held by members of the National Party.

Population centres
The 1931 New Zealand census had been cancelled due to the Great Depression, so the 1937 electoral redistribution had to take ten years of population growth into account. The increasing population imbalance between the North and South Islands had slowed, and only one electorate seat was transferred from south to north. Five electorates were abolished, one former electorate was re-established, and four electorates were created for the first time, including Remuera. The Remuera electorate replaced the Parnell electorate, covering almost exactly the same area as Parnell had since the 1927 electoral redistribution.

For the purposes of the country quota, the 1936 census had determined that the Remuera electorate was fully urban. The electorate comprised a number of east Auckland suburbs, most notably Remuera itself. The area is high-income, and has been represented by a succession of National Party MPs.

History
The electorate existed from 1938 to 1996. Endean was controversial within the National Party and in the party's 50-year history written by Barry Gustafson, it is remarked that in 1938, there was "some resistance to the National MP" in the Remuera electorate. His nomination for the planned 1941 general election only occurred after Sidney Holland had stepped in. Endean was overseas at the time of the selection, but even if he had been present, Gustafson believes that the "elderly, dull Endean would have been no match for the clever and witty Algie". Endean was the first sitting National MP who failed to get re-selected.

On election night  a shock upset in the electorate was predicted. Labour candidate Judith Tizard came within 406 votes of winning the National Party bastion of Remuera, being predicted as the winner after initial vote counting. Labour's temporary surge amongst traditional National stalwarts caused Prime Minister David Lange to question the direction his government was taking. In a 1996 interview he recalled, "That election night was a great revelation for me. That was an apprehension on my part that we had actually abandoned our constituency. And it set me to think what on earth have we done that we come within 400 votes of winning the true-blue seat of Remuera. And that struck me as being a dangerous flirtation, and an act of treachery to the people we were born to represent."

With the introduction of mixed-member proportional (MMP) representation in 1996, Remuera was included in the new electorate of Epsom.

Members of Parliament
Key

Election results

1993 election

1990 election

1987 election

1984 election

1981 election

1978 election

1975 election

1972 election

1969 election

1966 election

1963 election

1960 election

1957 election

1954 election

1951 election

1949 election

1946 election

1943 election

1938 election

Notes

References

 

Historical electorates of New Zealand
Politics of the Auckland Region
1938 establishments in New Zealand
1996 disestablishments in New Zealand